Lisa Belkin is an American journalist and author.  She is best known for Show Me a Hero: A Tale of Murder, Suicide, Race, and Redemption, her 1999 book about a public housing battle in Yonkers, New York.

Show Me a Hero received positive reviews. Publishers Weekly wrote that it was a "vivid slice of urban politics, racial tension and the difficulties inherent in realizing the American dream."  Kirkus Reviews declared it a "riveting policy chronicle and cautionary tale that illustrates the urgency of rethinking our public housing policy."  The New York Times praised Belkin for maintaining a reportorial objectivity.  Show Me a Hero served as the basis for the 2015 HBO miniseries, starring Oscar Isaac.
 
Her first book, First, Do No Harm: The Dramatic Story of Real Doctors and Patients Making Impossible Choices at a Big-City Hospital, was a New York Times 1993 Notable Book of the Year.

Belkin has worked as a journalist for Yahoo News, The New York Times, and HuffPost.  She hosted a radio show on XM, an outgrowth of her "Life's Work" column.

She is an adjunct faculty member at Columbia's School of Journalism.

Books
 First, Do No Harm: The Dramatic Story of Real Doctors and Patients Making Impossible Choices at a Big-City Hospital  (1993)
 Show Me a Hero: A Tale of Murder, Suicide, Race, and Redemption (1999)
 Life's Work: Confessions of an Unbalanced Mom (2002)
 Tales From the Times (2004), editor

References

External links

Living people
Year of birth missing (living people)
American women journalists
20th-century American non-fiction writers
21st-century American non-fiction writers
20th-century American women writers
21st-century American women writers